Kampong Penanjong is a village in Tutong District, Brunei, on the outskirts of the district town Pekan Tutong. The population was 2,065 in 2016. It is one of the villages within Mukim Pekan Tutong, a mukim in the district.

Facilities 
Penanjong Primary School is the village primary school; it was established in 1936. There is also Penanjong Religious School which is the village school for the primary level of the country's Islamic religious education.

The current village mosque is Kampong Penanjong Mosque; it was inaugurated on 6 April 1984 and can accommodate 500 worshippers. It replaced the former village mosque, Cahaya Derma Bakti Mosque, to accommodate the growing number of worshippers. The former mosque had been inaugurated by Sultan Omar Ali Saifuddien III on 25 August 1961.

 is a recreational area on Penanjong Beach, the beach along the village's coast with the South China Sea.

References 

Penanjong